Muresk may refer to:
 Muresk, Western Australia, town
 Muresk Institute, formerly Muresk Agricultural College